Sykehouse is a civil parish in the metropolitan borough of Doncaster, South Yorkshire, England.  The parish contains eight listed buildings that are recorded in the National Heritage List for England.  All the listed buildings are designated at Grade II, the lowest of the three grades, which is applied to "buildings of national importance and special interest".  The parish contains the village of Sykehouse and the surrounding countryside.  The listed buildings include farmhouses and farm buildings, a church and a cross base in the churchyard, a bridge, and a former windmill.


Buildings

References

Citations

Sources

 

Lists of listed buildings in South Yorkshire
Buildings and structures in the Metropolitan Borough of Doncaster